The Jameh Mosque of Qiblah (–  Masjed-e Qiblah) is a mosque in Kukherd city, the capital of Kukherd District in Bastak County, Hormozgan Province, Iran.

History
The Qiblah Mosque in (dehestan): Kukherd Rural District southern Iran, situated to the west of the Sibah Bazaar next to its entrance. This mosque was built between 1310 and 1313,  during the Qajar period.

References 
Peter Jackson and Lawrence Lockhart (Ed) (1986), Vol. 6th,  The Cambridge History of Iran: Cambridge University Press
الكوخردى ، محمد ، بن يوسف، (كُوخِرد حَاضِرَة اِسلامِيةَ عَلي ضِفافِ نَهر مِهران) الطبعة الثالثة ،دبى: سنة 199۷ للميلاد Mohammed Kookherdi (1997) Kookherd, an Islamic civil at Mehran river,  third edition: Dubai
محمدیان، کوخری، محمد ، “ (به یاد کوخرد) “، ج1. ج2. چاپ اول، دبی: سال انتشار 2003 میلادی Mohammed Kookherdi Mohammadyan (2003), Beyade Kookherd, third edition : Dubai.
محمدیان، کوخری، محمد. (وصف کوخرد)  ج1. چاپ دوم، دبی: سال انتشار 1998 میلادی Mohammed Kookherdi Mohammadyan (1998), Wasf Kookherd, second  edition : Dubai
محمدیان، کوخردی ، محمد ،  «شهرستان بستک و بخش کوخرد»  ، ج۱. چاپ اول، دبی: سال انتشار ۲۰۰۵ میلادی Mohammed Kookherdi Mohammadyan (2005), Shahrestan  Bastak & Bakhshe Kookherd, First edition : Dubai.
محمدیان ، کوخردی، محمد ،  « مشایخ مدنی »   ، چاپ دوم، دبی:   سال انتشار ۲۰۰۲ میلادی Mohammed Kookherdi Mohammadyan (2002), Mashaykh Madani, second  edition : Dubai

External links 
 Kookherd Website

Mosques in Iran
Buildings and structures in Hormozgan Province
Kukherd District
Bastak County
Archaeological sites in Iran
Monuments and memorials in Iran
Buildings and structures in Kukherd District
Religious buildings and structures completed in 1313
National works of Iran
Mosque buildings with domes
Qiblah